The 2013 French Athletics Championships was the 125th edition of the national championship in outdoor track and field for France. It was held on 12–14 July at the Stade Sébastien Charléty in Paris. A total of 38 events (divided evenly between the sexes) were contested over the three-day competition.

Results

Men

Women

References

Results
 Les championnats de France 2013 

French Athletics Championships
French Athletics Championships
French Athletics Championships
French Athletics Championships
Sports competitions in Paris
Athletics in Paris
French Athletics Championships